The current structure of the Romanian Land Forces is as follows:

Structure

Land Forces Command 
 General Headquarters in Bucharest
 Bucharest Garrison, in Bucharest
 30th Guard Brigade "Mihai Viteazul", in Bucharest
 2nd Logistics Base "Valahia", in Ploiești
 22nd Transport Battalion "Dâmboviţa", in Târgoviște
 102nd Maintenance Centre "Bucov", in Bucov
 265th Military Police Battalion "Tudor Vladimirescu", in Bucharest
 1st CIMIC Battalion "General de corp de armată Ştefan Holban", in Bucharest
 45th Communication and Informatics Battalion (CIS)  Battalion "Căpitan Grigore Giosanu", in Bucharest
 300th Support Battalion "Sarmis", in Bucharest
 500th Support Battalion "General de divizie Gheorghe Rusescu", in Bucharest

2nd Infantry Division "Getica" 
 2nd Infantry Division "Getica" HQ, in Buzău 3rd Logistics Base "Zargidava", in Roman
 43rd Transport Battalion "Roman I Muşat"
 83rd Maintenance Centre "Est"
 52nd Mixed Artillery Regiment "General Alexandru Tell", in Bârlad
 Mortar Battalion
 Artillery Battalion
 53rd Anti-aircraft Missile Regiment "Tropaeum Traiani", in Medgidia
 1st Anti-aircraft Missile Battalion (S-75 "Volhov" surface-to-air missile systems)
 61st Anti-aircraft Missile Regiment "Pelendava", in Craiova
 1st Anti-aircraft Missile Battalion (MIM-23 Hawk surface-to-air missile systems)
 528th Intelligence, Surveillance and Reconnaissance (ISR) Regiment "Vlad Țepeș", in Brăila
 3rd Engineer Battalion "General Constantin Poenaru", in Buzău
 47th Communication and Informatics Battalion (CIS) "General Nicolae Petrescu", in Buzău
 49th CBRN Battalion "Argeș" in Pitești
 200th Support Battalion "Istriţa", in Buzău
 202nd CBRN Battalion "General Gheorghe Teleman", in Huși
 4th Explosive Ordnance Disposal (EOD) Group, in Buzău

 1st Mechanized Brigade "Argedava" 
 1st Mechanized Brigade "Argedava" HQ, in Bucharest
 114th Tank Battalion "Petru Cercel", in TargovisteMilitary Press , June 2007
 2nd Infantry Battalion "Călugăreni" ("Desert Tigers"), in Bucharest
 495th Infantry Battalion "Căpitan Ștefan Soverth", in Clinceni
 113th Artillery Battalion "Bărăganul", in Slobozia
 288th Anti-aircraft Defense Battalion, in Focșani
 117th Logistic Support Battalion "Colonel Alexandru Polyzu", in Negoiesti

 2nd Mountain Hunters Brigade "Sarmizegetusa" 
 2nd Mountain Hunters Brigade "Sarmizegetusa" HQ, in Brașov
 21st Mountain Hunters Battalion "General Leonard Mociulschi", in Predeal
 30th Mountain Hunters Battalion "Dragoslavele", in Câmpulung
 33rd Mountain Hunters Battalion "Posada", in Curtea de Argeș
 206th Artillery Battalion "General Mihail Lăcătuşu", in Ghimbav
 228th Anti-aircraft Defense Battalion "Piatra Craiului", in Brașov
 229th Logistic Support Battalion "Cumidava", in Brașov

 9th Mechanized Brigade "Mărăşeşti" 
 9th Mechanized Brigade "Mărăşeşti" HQ, in Constanța
 912th Tank Battalion "Scythia Minor", in Murfatlar
 341st Mechanized Infantry Battalion "Rechinii Albi" , in Topraisar
 911th Mechanized Infantry Battalion "Capidava", in Medgidia
 345th Artillery Battalion "Tomis", in Medgidia
 348th Anti-aircraft Defense Battalion "Dobrogea", in Murfatlar
 168th Logistic Support Battalion "Pontus Euxinus", in Constanța

 282nd Armored Brigade "Unirea Principatelor" 
 282nd Armored Brigade "Unirea Principatelor" HQ, in Focșani
 284th Tank Battalion "Cuza Vodă", in Galați
 280th Mechanized Infantry Battalion "Căpitan Valter Mărăcineanu", in Focșani
 300th Mechanized Infantry Battalion "Sfântul Andrei", in Galați
 285th Artillery Battalion "Vlaicu Vodă", in Brăila
 288th Anti-aircraft Defense Battalion "Milcov", in Focșani
 469th Logistic Support Battalion "Putna", in Focșani

 4th Infantry Division "Gemina" 
 4th Infantry Division "Gemina" HQ, in Cluj-Napoca
 4th Logistics Base "Transilvania", in Dej
 41st Transport Battalion "Bobâlna", in Dej
 88th Maintenance Centre "Ardealul", in Cluj-Napoca
 69th Mixed Artillery Regiment "Silvania", in Șimleu Silvaniei
 7th Multiple Rocket Launcher Battalion "General Vasile Danacu", in Florești
 183rd Mixed Artillery Battalion "General Ion Dragalina", in Lugoj
 315th Artillery Battalion "Simion Bărnuţiu"
 316th Data Acquisition Battalion "Guruslău" 
 317th Logistic Support Battalion "Voievodul Gelu" , in Zalau
 50th Anti-aircraft Missile Regiment "Andrei Mureşianu", in Florești
 1st Anti-aircraft Missile Battalion (SA-6 "KUB" surface-to-air missile systems)
 2nd Anti-aircraft Missile Battalion (SA-8 "OSA-AKM" surface-to-air missile systems)
 317th Intelligence, Surveillance and Reconnaissance (ISR) Regiment "Vlădeasa", in Cluj-Napoca
 53rd Engineer Battalion "Scorilo", in Deva
 55th Communication and Informatics Battalion (CIS) "Napoca", in Cluj-Napoca
 72nd CBRN Battalion "Negru Vodă"', in Sighișoara
 400th Support Battalion "Feleacu", in Cluj-Napoca

 15th Mechanized Brigade "Podu Înalt" 
 15th Mechanized Brigade "Podu Înalt" HQ, in Iași
 631st Tank Battalion "Oituz", in Bacău
 151st Infantry Battalion "Războieni", in Iași
 634th Infantry Battalion "Mareșal Jósef Piłsudski", in Piatra Neamț
 335th Artillery Battalion "Alexandru cel Bun", in Botoșani
 635th Anti-aircraft Defense Battalion "Precista", in Bacău
 198th Logistic Support Battalion "Prut", in Iași

 18th Reconnaissance Surveillance Brigade "Decebal" 
 18th Reconnaissance Surveillance Brigade "Decebal" HQ, in Timișoara
 26th Mountain Reconnaissance Surveillance Battalion "Avram Iancu", in Brad
 32nd Reconnaissance Surveillance Battalion "Mircea", in Timișoara
 313th Reconnaissance Battalion "Burebista", in Clinceni 
 184th Sensors and Anti-aircraft Defense Battalion "Timiş", in Timișoara
 185th Logistic Support Battalion "Mureş", in Timisoara

 61st Mountain Hunters Brigade "Virgil Bădulescu" 
 61st Mountain Hunters Brigade "Virgil Bădulescu" HQ, in Miercurea Ciuc
 17th Mountain Hunters Battalion "Dragoş Vodă" , in Vatra Dornei
 22nd Mountain Hunters Battalion "Cireşoaia", in Sfântu Gheorghe
 24th Mountain Hunters Battalion "General Gheorghe Avramescu", in Miercurea Ciuc
 385th Artillery Battalion "Iancu de Hunedoara", in Odorheiu Secuiesc
 468th Anti-aircraft Defense Battalion "Trotuş", in Lunca de Sus
 435th Logistic Support Battalion "Ciuc", in Miercurea Ciuc

 81st Mechanized Brigade "General Grigore Bălan" 
 81st Mechanized Brigade "General Grigore Bălan" HQ, in Bistrița (aligned with the German Army's Rapid Forces Division)
 814th Tank Battalion "Mihai Vodă", in Turda
 191st Mixed Peacekeeping Infantry Battalion "Colonel Radu Golescu", in Arad
 811th Infantry Battalion "Dej", in Dej
 812th Infantry Battalion "Bistrița", in Bistrița
 813th Infantry Battalion "Maramureș", in Baia Mare
 817th Artillery Battalion "Petru Rareș", in Prundu Bârgăului
 612th Anti-tank Artillery Battalion "Maramureș", in Baia Mare
 3rd Anti-aircraft Defense Battalion "Potaissa", in Turda
 405th Logistic Support Battalion "Năsăud", in Bistrița

 6th Special Operations Brigade "Mihai Viteazul" 
 6th Special Operations Brigade "Mihai Viteazul" HQ, in Târgu Mureș
 51st Special Operations Battalion "Vulturii" (Eagles), in Târgu Mureș
 52nd Special Operations Battalion "Băneasa-Otopeni", in Buzău
 53rd Comando Battalion "Smaranda Brăescu", in Bacău
 54th Logistic Support Battalion "Horea, Cloșca și Crișan", in Târgu Mureș

 8th Tactical Operational Missile Brigade "Alexandru Ioan Cuza" 
 8th Tactical Operational Missile Brigade "Alexandru Ioan Cuza" HQ, in Focșani
 81st Tactical Operational Missile Battalion "Maior Gheorghe Şonţu", in Focșani
 83rd Multiple Rocket Launcher Battalion "Bogdan I", in Bârlad
 96th Multiple Rocket Launcher Battalion "Mircea Voievod", in Ploiești
 84th Data Acquisition Battalion "Mărăşti", in Focșani
 85th Logistic Support Battalion "General Mihail Cerchez", in Bârlad

 10th Engineer Brigade "Dunărea de Jos" 
 10th Engineer Brigade "Dunărea de Jos" HQ, in Brăila
 52nd Multinational Engineer Battalion "Tisa", in Satu Mare
 72nd Engineer Battalion "General Constantin Savu", in Brăila (Bridging)
 96th Engineer Battalion "Cetatea Bucureşti", in Bucharest (Bridging)
 136th Engineer Battalion "Apulum", in Alba Iulia (Bridging)
 River Crossing Battalion "Danubius"", in Brăila
 110th Logistic Support Battalion "Mareșal Constantin Prezan", in Brăila

 Training Command 
 Training Command HQ, in Bucharest
 Military Academy, in Sibiu
 NCO School, in Pitești
 3x Application Schools, each with a training battalion, in Sibiu, Pitesti and Buzău
 Military College "Mihai Viteazul", in Alba Iulia 
 Military College "Dimitrie Cantemir", in Breaza
 Military College "Ștefan cel Mare", in Câmpulung Moldovenesc
 Military College "Tudor Vladimirescu", in Craiova
 Military College "Alexandru Ioan Cuza", in Constanta

 NATO 
 NATO Allied Joint Force Command Naples, in Naples
 Headquarters Multinational Corps South-East (HQ MNC-SE), in Sibiu
 Headquarters Multinational Division Southeast (HQ MND-SE), in Bucharest
 Multinational Brigade South-East (HQ MN BDE-SE; former 2nd Infantry Brigade "Rovine"), in Craiova
 20th Infantry Battalion "Dolj", in Craiova
 22nd Infantry Battalion "Romanați", in Caracal
 26th Infantry Battalion "Neagoe Basarab", also known as the Red Scorpions, in Craiova (equipped with Piranha V armoured vehicles)
 325th Artillery Battalion "Alutus", in Caracal
 205th Air Defense Battalion "General Gheorghe Pârvulescu", in Craiova
 116th Logistic Battalion "Iancu Jianu", in Craiova

Geographic Distribution

References 

Romanian Land Forces
Romanian Land Forces